The 1986 Women's World Water Polo Championship was the first edition of the women's water polo tournament at the World Aquatics Championships, organised by the world governing body in aquatics, the FINA. The tournament was held from 14 to 22 August 1986, and was incorporated into the 1986 World Aquatics Championships in Madrid, Spain.

Teams

GROUP A

GROUP B

Preliminary round

GROUP A

GROUP B

Final round

GROUP C

GROUP D

Final ranking

Individual awards
Most Valuable Player
???

Best Goalkeeper
???

Medalists

References

 Results

1986
Women's tournament
1986 in women's water polo
Women's water polo in Spain
1986 in Spanish women's sport